Chikako (written: ,  or ) is a feminine Japanese given name. Notable people with the name include:

Chikako, Princess Kazu
Fujiwara no Chikako (藤原親子), Japanese noblewoman and waka poet 
, Japanese snowboarder
, Japanese female volleyball player
Chikako Mese American mathematician
Minamoto no Chikako (源 親子), was the daughter of Kitabatake Morochika 
, Japanese basketball player
, Japanese women's professional shogi player
, Japanese swimmer
, Japanese badminton player
, Japanese mangaka
, Japanese filmmaker and video artist

See also
4577 Chikako, a main-belt asteroid

Japanese feminine given names